SS Swarland was a Danish cargo ship that disappeared near Rotterdam, The Netherlands while she was travelling from Rostock, Germany to Rotterdam, The Netherlands.

Construction 
Swarland was constructed in 1867 at the Henderson, Coulborn and Company shipyard in Renfrew, United Kingdom as Danmark. She was completed in 1867. She had a single screw propeller with steam propulsion. The engine was rated at 100 nhp.

Sinking 
On 26 September 1911, Swarland left Rostock, Germany for Rotterdam, The Netherlands. She disappeared on 30 September 1911 and was last seen close to Rotterdam.

References

Steamships of Denmark
Missing ships
Cargo ships of Denmark
Ships built on the River Clyde
1867 ships
Ships lost with all hands
Shipwrecks in the North Sea
September 1911 events
Maritime incidents in 1911